The 2022–23 Melbourne Stars Women's season was the eighth in the team's history. Coached by Jonathan Batty and captained by Nicole Faltum, the Stars finished the regular season of WBBL08 in sixth position and failed to qualify for the finals.

Squad 
Each 2022–23 squad was made up of 15 active players. Teams could sign up to five 'marquee players', with a maximum of three of those from overseas. Marquees were classed as any overseas player, or a local player who holds a Cricket Australia national contract at the start of the WBBL|08 signing period.

Personnel changes made ahead of the season included:

 Meg Lanning withdrew from the tournament, having taken indefinite leave from cricket. Nicole Faltum was subsequently appointed captain of the Stars, replacing Lanning.
 Jonathan Batty was appointed head coach of the Stars, replacing Jarrad Loughman.
 Erin Osborne announced her retirement from cricket at the conclusion of the previous season.
 Elyse Villani departed the Stars, signing for the Hobart Hurricanes.
 Maddy Darke departed the Stars, signing for the Perth Scorchers.
 Sasha Moloney signed with the Stars, having previously played for the Hobart Hurricanes.
 English marquees Maia Bouchier and Linsey Smith did not re-sign with the Stars.
 English marquee Alice Capsey signed with the Stars, marking her first appearance in the league.
 English marquee Lauren Winfield-Hill signed with the Stars, having previously played for the Brisbane Heat, Hobart Hurricanes and Adelaide Strikers.
 Indian marquee Jemimah Rodrigues signed with the Stars, having previously played for the Melbourne Renegades.
 Kim Garth, previously an overseas marquee signing, was approved as a local player for the Stars due to her permanent residence in Australia and a lack of recent international cricket appearances for Ireland.
 English marquee Bess Heath signed with the Stars as a replacement player, marking her first appearance in the league.

The table below lists the Stars players and their key stats (including runs scored, batting strike rate, wickets taken, economy rate, catches and stumpings) for the season.

Ladder

Fixtures 

All times are AEDT.

In the 15th meeting between the two Melbourne teams—the first to take place in their home city since 30 November 2019—the Renegades lost three early wickets before Josie Dooley and Courtney Webb formed a 50-run partnership from 39 balls. Sarah Coyte hit two sixes off the bowling of Kim Garth in the 20th over, helping to set a target of 149 for victory.

The Stars began the run chase sluggishly, and failed to capitalise on several controversial umpiring decisions in their favour. Alice Capsey survived a close stumping chance but was ultimately dismissed for just eleven, while the Decision Review System overturned an LBW call for Garth who would nevertheless fall to the bowling of Coyte in the following over. Earlier in the innings, Coyte became the eighth player in WBBL history to claim 100 career wickets.

Annabel Sutherland breathed life into the contest as the Stars scored 22 runs from the 14th over against the previously economical Ella Hayward. The Renegades created several opportunities to effectively close out the match but put down key catching chances, which included an error in the field by Shabnim Ismail off her own bowling.

Needing an unlikely 23 runs from six balls to win, Sutherland promptly launched two sixes to dramatically shift the game's momentum. While delivering the third ball of the final over, Renegades captain Sophie Molineux suffered a knee injury which forced her from the field. Georgia Prestwidge was subsequently given the task of finishing the over, having not bowled throughout the innings up to that point. Sutherland proceeded to hit another six, and Stars captain Nicole Faltum then scored one run off the last delivery of the match to clinch her team's sixth win against their crosstown rivals.

Statistics and awards 
 Most runs: Annabel Sutherland – 304 (11th in the league)
 Highest score in an innings: Alice Capsey – 80* (52) vs Hobart Hurricanes, 15 November 2022
 Most wickets: Annabel Sutherland – 21 (equal 6th in the league)
 Best bowling figures in an innings: Sasha Moloney – 4/15 (4 overs) vs Melbourne Renegades, 13 November 2022
 Most catches (fielder): Sasha Moloney – 12 (equal 2nd in the league)
 Player of the Match awards:
 Annabel Sutherland – 2
 Alice Capsey, Tess Flintoff, Sasha Moloney – 1 each
WBBL|08 Player of the Tournament: Annabel Sutherland (equal 9th)
WBBL|08 Team of the Tournament: Annabel Sutherland
WBBL|08 Young Gun Award: Tess Flintoff

References

Further reading

 

2022–23 Women's Big Bash League season by team
Melbourne Stars (WBBL)